PML-RARA-regulated adapter molecule 1 is a protein that in humans is encoded by the PRAM1 gene.

Function 

The protein encoded by this gene is similar to FYN binding protein (FYB/SLAP-130), which is an adaptor protein involved in T cell receptor mediated signaling. This gene is expressed and regulated during normal myelopoiesis. The expression of this gene is induced by retinoic acid and is inhibited by the expression of PML-RARalpha, a fusion protein of promyelocytic leukemia (PML) and the retinoic acid receptor-alpha (RARalpha).

Interactions 

PRAM1 has been shown to interact with TRIM27.

References

Further reading